California's 43rd congressional district is a congressional district in the U.S. state of California that is currently represented by . The district is centered in the southern part of Los Angeles County, and includes portions of the cities of Los Angeles (including LAX) and Torrance. It includes the entirety of the cities of Hawthorne, Lawndale, Gardena, Inglewood, and Lomita.
From 2003 until 2013, the 43rd district was based in San Bernardino County. The Hispanic-majority district encompassed the southwestern part of the county, and included San Bernardino and Rialto.

Competitiveness

In statewide races

Composition

As of the 2020 redistricting, California's 43rd congressional district is located in the South Bay region of Los Angeles County. This district includes Los Angeles International Airport.

Los Angeles County is split between this district, the 36th district, 37th district, 44th district, and the 42nd district. The 43rd and 36th are partitioned by W Florence Ave, Arbor Vitae St, Westchester Parkway, La Tijera Blvd, W 91st St, Cum Laude Ave, W 92nd St, Waterview St, Napoleon St, Vista Del Mar, W Imperial Highway, Aviation Blvd, Del Aire Park, E Sl Segundo Blvd, S Aviation Blvd, Marine Ave, Inglewood Ave, Highway 91, Redondo Beach Blvd, Hawthorne Blvd, and Sepulveda Blvd.

The 43rd, 37th and 42nd are partitioned by E 91st St, McKinley Ave, E 88th Pl, Avalon Blvd, E Manchester Ave, S Normandie Ave, W 94th Pl, S Halldale Ave, W Century Blvd, La Salle Ave/S Denker Ave, W 104th St, S Western Ave, W 108th St, S Gramercy Pl, S Van Ness Ave, W 76th St, 8th Ave, W 79th St, S Victoria Ave, W 74th St, West Blvd, W 64th St, S La Brea Ave, 6231 S La Brea Ave-Flight Ave, W 64th St, 6404 S Springpark Ave-W Fairview Blvd, W Centinela Ave, Ave, S Central Ave, Firestone Blvd-E 90 St, S Central Ave, E 103rd St, Success Ave, E 92nd St, E 91st, Croesus Ave, and E 97th St.

The 43rd and the 44th are partitioned by Alameda St, E 103rd St, Mona Blvd, E 107th Pl, E 108th St, S Alameda St, Highway 105, Mona Blvd, Santa Fe Ave, E Stockton Ave, N Bullis Rd, Palm Ave/E Killen Pl, N Thorson Ave, McMillan St, Waldorf Dr/N Castlegate Ave, S Gibson Ave, Wright Rd, E Rosecrans Ave, Highway 710, Somerset Blvd, Myrrh St, Hunsake Ave, Alondra Blvd, E Greenleaf Blvd, Main Campus Dr, S Susana Rd, Highway 91, Highway 47, Calle Anita, 2605 Homestead Pl-266 W Apras St, 255 W Victoria St-18300 S Wilmington Ave, W Victoria St, Central Ave, Lincoln Memorial Park, 2600 W Billings St-2973 W Caldwell St, Malloy Ave/S Clymar Ave, W Alondra Blvd, S Figueroa St, W 182nd St, Electric St, and S Western Ave.

The 43rd takes in the cities of Hawthorne, Inglewood, Lawndale, Compton, and northeast Torrance, as well as the Los Angeles neighborhood of Watts.

Cities & CDP with 10,000 or more people
 Los Angeles - 3,898,747
 Torrance - 147,067
 Inglewood - 107,762
 Compton - 95,740
 Hawthorne - 88,083
 Lawndale - 31,807

List of members representing the district

Election results

1972

1974

1976

1978

1980

1982

1984

1986

1988

1990

1992

1994

1996

1998

2000

2002

2004

2006

2008

2010

2012

2014

2016

2018

2020

2022

Historical district boundaries
From 2003 through 2013, the district consisted of many of San Bernardino's central suburbs, including San Bernardino, Ontario and Fontana. Due to redistricting after the 2010 United States Census, the district has moved south west into South Los Angeles and now includes Hawthorne and Inglewood.

See also
List of United States congressional districts

References

External links
The new District 43— California's GovTrack.us: Map of current 43rd congressional district (Westside, Los Angeles County)
California Voter Foundation map of former 43rd congressional district (San Bernardino County) — (pre-2013).
RAND.org: California Election Returns for pre-2013 43rd congressional district  (San Bernardino County)

43
Government of Los Angeles County, California
Government of Los Angeles
Westside (Los Angeles County)
Gardena, California
Hawthorne, California
Inglewood, California
Lawndale, California
Lomita, California
Playa del Rey, Los Angeles
Playa Vista, Los Angeles
Torrance, California
Westchester, Los Angeles
Constituencies established in 1973
1973 establishments in California